This is the list of football clubs in East Timor.

Liga Futebol Amadora
In 2019 the clubs that participated in the Liga Futebol Amadora were:

Primeira Divisão 

 Académica
 Assalam
 Atlético Ultramar
 Boavista
 Karketu Dili
 Lalenok United
 Ponta Leste
 Sport Laulara e Benfica

Segunda Divisão 

 Aitana FC
 FC Kablaky
 Fitun Estudante
 Porto Taibesse
 FC Zebra
 Cacusan CF
 DIT FC
 FC Nagarjo
 Lica-Lica Lemorai
 Santa Cruz FC
 Sporting Clube
 FC Lero

Terceira Divisão 

 Emmanuel FC
 AC Mamura
 AS Inur Transforma
 Karau Fuik FC
 AD Maubisse
 Laleia United FC
 AS Marca FC
 YMCA Comoro FC
 ADR União
 Kuda Ulun FC
 AS Lero

Former Liga Futebol Amadora Clubs 
Clubs that have participated in the Liga Futebol Amadora sometime between 2015-2018, however are not currently a part of the competition:

 Sport Dili e Benfica
 FC Café
 FC Irmãos Unidos
 União Tokodede
 LA Matebian
 FC Leopa
 Liquica FC

Liga Feto Timor 2020 Clubs 
The following clubs participated in the Liga Feto Timor female football competition in 2020.

 Académica
 Ass. Baucau FC
 Sport Laulara e Benfica
 Buibere FC
 Marathana FC
 Maudoko FC
 Nain-Feto FC
 S'Amuser FC
 São José FC
 Unital FC
 VDL FC

Taça Digicel
In 2011 the member clubs of the Taça Digicel were:

Ad. Aileu
Ad. Ainaro
A.D. Baucau
Ad. Bobonaro
Ad. Cova Lima
A.D. Dili Leste
Ad. Dili Oeste
Ad. Ermera
Ad. Lautem
Ad. Liquica
Ad. Manatuto
Ad. Manufahi
Ad. Oecusse
Ad. Viqueque

Super Liga

Clubs that played in the Super Liga in 2006 included:

Académica
F.C. Café
Fima Sporting
SLB Laulara
FC Porto Taibesi
F.C. Rusa Fuik
AD Vos Esperança
F.C. Zebra

Clubs that played in the Pra Liga in 2005–06 included:.

FC Audin
Bulgária SC (East Timor)
Cacusan CF
F.C. Irmãos Unidos
Kulugisa
AS Lero
São Jose  
ADR União
Virtu

References

 
East Timor
Football clubs
Football clubs